The Provincial Tower (also known as Provincial Bank Tower, or BBVA Banco Provincial Tower) is a skyscraper located in the Venezuelan city of Caracas, stands out as the fifth-highest office tower in the city and Venezuela, was inaugurated in 1984, has 40 floors and is about  high, is located in the Candelaria Parish, northwest of Libertador Municipality of Caracas.

This building does host a major private financial institutions operating in the country, the Provincial Bank which is controlled by the Spanish group Banco Bilbao Vizcaya or BBVA, hence after 1997 be called BBVA Provincial Bank Tower.

See also 
List of tallest buildings in South America

References 
https://www.emporis.com/buildings/151667/centro-financiero-provincial-caracas-venezuela

Buildings and structures in Caracas
Skyscraper office buildings in Venezuela
Office buildings completed in 1984